The 1994 California Insurance Commissioner election occurred on November 8, 1994. The primary elections took place on March 8, 1994. The Republican nominee, Chuck Quackenbush, narrowly defeated the Democratic nominee, State Senator Art Torres, for the office previously held by incumbent John Garamendi, who chose not to seek re-election in favor of running for governor.

Primary results
Final results from the California Secretary of State

Democratic

Republican

Others

Election results
Final results from the Secretary of State of California.

Results by county

See also
California state elections, 1994
California Insurance Commissioner

References

External links
VoteCircle.com Non-partisan resources & vote sharing network for Californians
Information on the elections from California's Secretary of State

1994 California elections
1994
California